Yvette Salazar Torres (born 31 July 1979) is a Mexican politician affiliated with the Ecologist Green Party of Mexico. As of 2014 she served as deputy of the LIX Legislature of the Mexican Congress as a plurinominal representative.

References

1979 births
Living people
Politicians from Guadalajara, Jalisco
Women members of the Chamber of Deputies (Mexico)
Members of the Chamber of Deputies (Mexico)
Ecologist Green Party of Mexico politicians
Deputies of the LIX Legislature of Mexico